Gudrun Wegner (later Wünsche, 28 February 1955 – 16 January 2005) was a German swimmer. She competed at the 1972 Summer Olympics in the 200, 400 and 800 m freestyle events; she won a bronze medal in the 400 m and finished fifth in 800 m. Later she won one gold, one silver and two bronze medals in the 400 m medley and 800 m freestyle events at the 1973 World Aquatics Championships and 1974 European Aquatics Championships. In 1973 she also set a world record in the 400 m medley.

After retirement from competitions she graduated from the German Institute of Physical Education (DHfK) in Leipzig and worked as a coach. The unification of Germany left her jobless. She briefly worked as waitress and then re-trained as social therapist. She died of cancer.

References

1955 births
2005 deaths
People from Görlitz
East German female swimmers
East German female freestyle swimmers
East German female medley swimmers
Olympic swimmers of East Germany
Swimmers at the 1972 Summer Olympics
Olympic bronze medalists for East Germany
Olympic bronze medalists in swimming
Medalists at the 1972 Summer Olympics
World Aquatics Championships medalists in swimming
European Aquatics Championships medalists in swimming
Deaths from cancer in Germany
Sportspeople from Saxony